George Tillman Gregory Jr. (1921-2003) was an associate justice and chief justice on the South Carolina Supreme Court. He began practicing law in 1944, served in the 1950s in the South Carolina Statehouse, and became a state trial court judge in 1956. He was sworn in as the chief justice on February 26, 1988. Although his term was to expire in 1994, Gregory gave notice of his retirement in 1991. Gregory died on January 23, 2003, and is buried at the Evergreen Cemetery in Chester, South Carolina.

References

Chief Justices of the South Carolina Supreme Court
Justices of the South Carolina Supreme Court
1921 births
People from York County, South Carolina
2003 deaths
20th-century American judges